This list of the tallest buildings and structures in Greater Manchester ranks buildings in Greater Manchester by height.

This is the largest number of high-rises in any metropolitan area in the United Kingdom outside Greater London.

History and future development
The first proposed skyscraper in Central Manchester was the  Quay Street Tower. Envisioned to be completed in 1948, it would have been the tallest tower in Europe. The proposal was rejected and said to be inconsiderate, as much of the city was still rebuilding after the Manchester Blitz of the Second World War.

The first tall building boom in Greater Manchester occurred in the 1960s and 1970s, with notable buildings including the  CIS Tower, which became the tallest building in the United Kingdom when constructed in 1962 and the  City Tower.

Through the 1980s and 1990s, few significant proposals came to fruition. However, there has been a renewed interest in skyscrapers in Manchester in the 21st century, with a number of proposals being brought forward. South Tower is due to be surpassed by the end of the decade by The Lighthouse, a  skyscraper also in the Great Jackson Street framework.

Unlike most major cities in the United Kingdom, there are no height restrictions and local planning officers generally adopt a laissez-faire attitude towards city centre high-rises in Manchester. Each of these figures are substantially higher than anywhere else in the United Kingdom outside of London.

Central Manchester is the predominant location for tall proposals, with 44 buildings over  either built, under construction or proposed, along with a further 13 being built, under construction or proposed in Salford, immediately to the west of Central Manchester.

Both areas are part of wider masterplans to expand Central Manchester and Salford out southwards and westwards respectively, with amenities such as new green areas and schools to enable urban living.

The northern side of the city also contains a number of office and residential developments either completed or, as of March 2023, under construction as part of the £800 million NOMA development. Significant completed projects within NOMA include One Angel Square, a modern zero carbon emissions energy-plus building and the  Angel Gardens residential tower. These buildings will be joined by the Angel Meadow development, which will deliver three new residential towers including the  Angel Meadow Park and Angel Square office towers, and the Gas Works development which will deliver nine separate buildings ranging from 8 to 34 storeys.

Further into the future, Piccadilly is expected to become an area of intense development into the 2030s when HS2 is due to become operational in Central Manchester. Large office and residential tower proposals are expected as part of the development.

List: Completed structures
This list ranks structurally complete buildings and free-standing structures in Greater Manchester that stand at least , based on standard height measurement. This includes spires and architectural details but does not include antenna masts.

An equals sign (=) following a rank indicates the same height between two or more buildings. The "Year" column indicates the year in which a building was completed. Buildings that have been demolished are not included.

Completed

List: Under construction

Under construction
This lists buildings that are under construction in Greater Manchester and are planned to rise at least . Under construction buildings that have already been topped out are listed above.

Approved
This lists buildings that are approved for construction in Greater Manchester and are planned to rise at least . If approved projects do not start construction within five years of their approval date they are assumed to be no longer active and considered 'unbuilt' unless further information is available.

Proposed
This lists buildings that are proposed for construction in Greater Manchester and are planned to rise at least . If proposed projects are not approved within five years of their proposal date they are assumed to be no longer active and considered 'unbuilt' unless further information is available.

List: Unbuilt

Unbuilt
This lists proposals for the construction of buildings in Greater Manchester that were planned to rise at least , for which planning permission was rejected or which were otherwise withdrawn.

Demolished
This lists buildings in Greater Manchester that were at least 50 metres (164 ft) and have since been demolished.

Timeline

Timeline of tallest buildings and structures
After a period after the 1960s building boom where few new significant buildings were built in Greater Manchester, the early 21st century has seen a long list of proposals meaning the skyline has been transformed in recent decades. In 2018, Deansgate Square South Tower became the tallest building in Greater Manchester and the tallest in the United Kingdom outside London.

Future tallest
This lists the top 20 buildings in order of height in Greater Manchester that are either completed, under construction, approved or proposed. The imminent transformation of the Manchester skyline is made clear with only five of the top 20 already constructed, with four under construction, five approved and six proposed.

Maps and Gallery

See also
 List of tallest buildings and structures in Salford
 List of tallest buildings in the United Kingdom
 List of tallest buildings in Europe
 List of tallest buildings

References

External links

Greater Manchester
Tallest